Brant Chambers (born 4 January 1980) is an Australian rules footballer who played for Subiaco Football Club in the West Australian Football League (WAFL) and for Sturt in the South Australian National Football League (SANFL).

Playing career
Chambers played junior football for Eastern Range in Victoria, later playing for Gembrook Cockatoo Football Club.

In 2000 Chambers played eight matches for Subiaco in the WAFL.

He played several seasons for Nightcliff in the Northern Territory Football League from 2000/01. In January 2001 he represented the Northern Territory in a match against Port Adelaide.

Chambers was recruited to by Sturt in the SANFL in 2001. In 2002 he played in Sturt's premiership side. Between 2001 and 2010 he played 204 games and scoring 672 goals, seventh on the all-time list of SANFL goalkickers. He won the Ken Farmer Medal for the SANFL's leading goal kicker three times; kicking 106 goals in 2007 (the last time as of 2014 that an SANFL player has kicked over 100 goals in a season), 97 in 2008 and 80 in 2009. He left the club before the 2011 SANFL season, moving to Orange, New South Wales, where he worked as a scaffolder.

In early 2012, Chambers rejoined Subiaco having not played in 2011. He made his return to league football in round five.

Brant is currently now under employment in the Western Australia, Pilbara region excelling as a barge master in the marine industry.  Due to rising tensions between supervision,  it is brants responsibility to keep the peace between the barges.  Due to this on going issue, we may see Brant back on the field in the near foreseeable future.  He will be sorely missed by his upper superior, captain FOT.  FOT will ensure his debts to the 500 Barge fridge will be cleared before moving on.

References

External links

1980 births
Living people
Sturt Football Club players
Australian rules footballers from South Australia
Subiaco Football Club players
Nightcliff Football Club players
Northern Territory Football Club players